Ilanga bicarinata is a species of sea snail, a marine gastropod mollusk in the family Solariellidae.

Subspecies
 Ilanga bicarinata bicarinata (A. Adams & Reeve, 1850)
 Ilanga bicarinata sphinx Herbert, 1987

Description
The shell has a depressed orbicular shape with a broad umbilicus. Its color is white, closely painted longitudinally with wide brown stripes. The shell contains 5½ smooth whorls. The apex is acute. The whorls are bicarinated. The carinae are distant. The interspaces are concave, spirally closely lineated, concentrically striated. The color of the shell is brownish or yellowish, variegated with reddish flammules. The carinae are obliquely articulated with red. The interior is iridescent.

This shell is characterized externally by a certain metallic hue, whilst it is particularly iridescent in the interior.

Distribution
This marine species occurs in "Eastern Seas" (not further specified).

References

 Adams, A. & Reeve, L., 1848, The Zoology of the voyage of H.M.S. Samarang, 1-84, pls.1-24, Reeve, Benham, and Reeve, London

External links
 To World Register of Marine Species

bicarinata
Gastropods described in 1850